This is a list of electoral district results for the 1986 Queensland state election.

Results by electoral district

Albert

Archerfield

Ashgrove

Aspley

Auburn

Balonne

Barambah

By-election 

 This by-election was caused by the resignation of Joh Bjelke-Petersen. It was held on 16 April 1988.

Barron River

Bowen

Brisbane Central

Broadsound

Bulimba

Bundaberg

Burdekin

Burnett

Caboolture 

 The redistribution of electoral boundaries before the election made Caboolture a notionally Labor seat. The Nationals did not regain it.

Cairns

Callide

Carnarvon

Chatsworth

Condamine

Cook

Cooroora

Cunningham

Currumbin

Everton

Fassifern

Flinders

Glass House

Greenslopes

Gregory

Gympie

Hinchinbrook

Ipswich

Ipswich West

Isis

Landsborough

Lockyer

Logan

Lytton

Mackay

Manly

Mansfield

Maryborough

Merthyr

By-election 

 This by-election was caused by the resignation of Don Lane. It was held on 13 May 1989.

Mirani

Moggill

Mount Coot-tha

Mount Gravatt

Mount Isa

Mourilyan

Mulgrave

Murrumba

Nerang

Nicklin

Nudgee

Nundah

Peak Downs

Pine Rivers

Port Curtis

Redcliffe

Redlands

Rockhampton

Rockhampton North

Roma

Salisbury

Sandgate

Sherwood

Somerset

South Brisbane

South Coast

By-election 

 This by-election was caused by the resignation of Russ Hinze. It was held on 28 August 1988.

Southport

By-election 

 This by-election was caused by the death of Doug Jennings. It was held on 20 June 1987.

Springwood

Stafford

Surfers Paradise

Tablelands

Thuringowa

Toowong

Toowoomba North

Toowoomba South

Townsville 

The redistribution before the election made Townsville a notionally National-held seat. The Labor candidate did not manage to win it back.

Townsville East

Warrego

Warwick

Whitsunday

Windsor

Wolston

Woodridge

Yeronga

See also 

 1986 Queensland state election
 Members of the Queensland Legislative Assembly, 1986–1989
 Candidates of the Queensland state election, 1986

References 

Results of Queensland elections